The 5th International Film Festival of India was held from 30 December 1974 - 12 January 1975 in New Delhi.  India adopted, at its fifth festival, a permanent insignia at the fifth edition, representing the peacock, India's national bird, with a permanent motto of the festival "Vasudhaiva Kutumbakam" (The whole world is a family). The same year it was also decided to hold a non-competitive festival of films "Filmotsav" alternating with IFFI.

Winners
Golden Peacock (Best Film): "Dreaming Youth" by János Rózsás (Hungarian Film)
Golden Peacock (Best Short Film): "Automatic" (Czechoslovakin film)

References

1975 film festivals
1974 film festivals
05
1975 in Indian cinema
1974 in Indian cinema